The Samsung Omnia 7 (also known as the SGH-i8700) is a smartphone which runs Microsoft's Windows Phone operating system. It features a Qualcomm Snapdragon QSD8250 SoC clocked at 1 GHz, a 4.0-inch Super AMOLED screen with a resolution of 480×800, and either 8 GB or 16 GB capacity of internal storage. The phone does not contain a microSD slot for extra storage. It was available in Europe and South Africa, whereas the Samsung Focus was sold in the United States. The Samsung Omnia 7 supports Windows Phone 7.8.

Software issues
Some users of the Omnia 7 along with the Samsung Focus had issues with upgrading to the March 2011 update and again with the NODO update. Samsung and Microsoft have since worked to deliver updates for the phones to resolve the upgrade problem.

See also
Windows Phone

References

External links
 Official Samsung Omnia 7 homepage

Windows Phone devices
Samsung smartphones
Mobile phones introduced in 2010
Mobile phones with user-replaceable battery